

England regional news programmes

UK nations news

UK nations news on other channels

International news

BBC News programmes
Lists of radio programs